Akolner is a village near Ahmednager in Maharashtra, India. Akolner is 16 km far from its District Main City Ahmednagar. It is 105 km away from Pune and 250 km away from the state capital, Mumbai.

The National award-winning Marathi film Fandry, released on 14 February 2014, was shot in Akolner. 
In pre-independace era, Akolner was governed by Dabholkars after 1920s.

Economy
Oil depots belonging to Indian Oil and Bharat Petroleum are situated in the village, which is accessible by railway and by road. It is also famous for milk production, peacocks found in farms & floriculture.

Notable people
Akolner is the birthplace of Das Ganu, a follower of Sai Baba of Shirdi.

References 

Villages in Ahmednagar district